A manifold is an abstract mathematical space which, in a close-up view, resembles the spaces described by Euclidean geometry.

Manifold may also refer to:

Arts and music
 Manifold (comics), a fictional character in Marvel Comics publications
 Manifold Records, a record label
 Manifold Trilogy, by science fiction author Stephen Baxter

Engineering
 Manifold (fluid mechanics), a machine element used to split or combine a gas or liquid
 Hydraulic manifold, a component used to regulate fluid flow in a hydraulic system, thus controlling the transfer of power between actuators and pumps
 Manifold (scuba), in a scuba set, connects two or more diving cylinders
 Vacuum gas manifold, a piece of apparatus used in chemistry to manipulate gases
 Exhaust manifold, an engine part which collects the exhaust gases from multiple cylinders into one pipe
 Inlet manifold or "intake manifold", an engine part which supplies the air or fuel/air mixture to the cylinders

Mathematics
 Manifold, an abstract mathematical space which, in a close-up view, resembles the spaces described by Euclidean geometry.
 Manifold (magazine), a former magazine of the University of Warwick mathematical community
 Topological manifold, a topological space which is a locally Euclidean Hausdorff space
 Almost complex manifold
 Algebraic manifold
 Analytic manifold
 Calabi–Yau manifold
 Complex manifold, a manifold over the complex numbers
 Differentiable manifold
 Einstein manifold
 Flag manifold
 Flat manifold
 G2 manifold
 Hermitian manifold
 Iwasawa manifold
 Orientable manifold

People
 John Manifold (1915–1985), Australian poet and critic
 Sir Walter Manifold (1849–1928), Australian grazier and politician

Places
 Manifold, Pennsylvania, US
 River Manifold, a river in Staffordshire, West Midlands, England
 Manifold Way, a footpath and cycleway following the route of a former railway

Science
 Manifold (fluid mechanics), a machine element used to split or combine a gas or liquid
 various applications such as automotive exhaust manifolds: see Engineering section
 Vacuum manifold, in quantum field theory

Software
 Manifold System, a geographic information system software package
 ManifoldCF, Apache Software Foundation open-source project for transferring content between repositories or search indexes